The Smith-Ransome Japanese Bridge of South Ferry Hills on Shelter Island, New York is one of the first 'reinforced concrete construction' structures built in North America by engineer Ernest L. Ransome for the mineral prospector known as the "Borax King", Francis Marion Smith. Installed in the late 19th century at Smith's East Coast estate, 'Presdeleau', it is an example of ferro-concrete construction enabling an elegant design of what was a popular early 20th century period piece, the Japanese style bridge. It is listed on the New York State and National Register of Historic Places as a significant historical landmark and one of the last surviving two by Ernest Ransome.

Early history
Presdeleau was one of Francis Smith's mansions away from his main estate in Oakland, California called Arbor Villa. Between 1895 and 1898 he also commissioned Ransome to build at the estate in New York a Japanese style bridge and seawall similar to the two underpass bridges that he had already constructed out west.  In 1886 Ransome built the two small underpass bridges in the Golden Gate Park, San Francisco, one of which survives today. They are the first reinforced concrete bridges in North America, and among the first three or four in the world. In 1897 he completed the Pacific Coast Borax Refinery in Bayonne, New Jersey and Smith had him work on the 60 foot x 6 feet wide bridge at Presdeleau. The architect would achieve fame for the east coast refinery building after it caught fire in 1902 and the concrete framed industrial architecture was shown to have a key superiority over competing steel and iron framed structures, as the buildings frame was only slightly damaged. Ransome's two other buildings that used the same experimental style at Stanford University survived the 1906 San Francisco earthquake essentially without damage while surrounding buildings crumbled.

Conservancy
One hundred years later the estate at Presdeleau had been apportioned and sold in smaller parcels, leaving the Japanese bridge in need of restoration. The Smith-Ransome Japanese Bridge Conservancy was created in 2015 to support the preservation and maintenance of the concrete bridge and associated sea wall which is set in a lagoon that is in current use as a boat basin called Smiths Pond. The small bridge is just behind the beach at Smith Cove on the Peconic River and it looks out at the upper Sag Harbor bay from South Ferry hills. In 2017 it was nominated to the state historic register and in 2018 it was placed on the NRHP as significant for the type of construction and its significance to the history of Shelter Island.

Gallery

References 

 online biography
 Japanese rock garden – Information on zen gardens

External links
 Shelter-island.org: "Frank Smith, the Borax King, on Shelter Island" homepage

Buildings and structures in New York (state)
National Register of Historic Places in Suffolk County, New York
Concrete pioneers
National Register of Historic Places in Shelter Island, New York
Japanese gardens in the United States
Japanese style of gardening
Architecture in New York (state)
Buildings and structures in Suffolk County, New York
Suffolk County, New York
Suffolk
Suffolk County, New York
Bridges on Long Island
Bridges in Suffolk County, New York